Pterocarya rhoifolia (Japanese wingnut, Japanese: sawagurumi) is a species of tree in the Juglandaceae family that is widely distributed throughout Japan, and also found native to China in the Laoshan District in eastern Shandong Province.

The tree flourishes in moist areas along riverbanks and mountain streams, and attains  in height, flowering from May–July.

It is a soft light wood, with the heartwood yellowish-white in color, which has been used as a substitute of kiri (Paulownia tomentosa), for example, to make geta clogs that are imitations of kiri-geta. It is straight-grained and the pore pattern on the surface provides the wood with a handsome appearance.

References

rhoifolia
Trees of China
Trees of Japan